Singer of Sad Songs is an album by American country music artist Waylon Jennings, released in 1970 on RCA Nashville.

Background
Unlike most other RCA country albums, Singer of Sad Songs was recorded at their "Music Center of the World" studios in Hollywood with Lee Hazlewood producing. Only the title track (which hit #12) was recorded in Nashville with producer Danny Davis.  As a result, RCA Victor was unwilling to promote the album, and the situation got to the core of Jennings' frustrations with the constraints RCA imposed on his music.  In the audio version of his autobiography, the singer recalled:

"If you were a country artist signed to Nashville, the record company treated you like an uninvited guest at the dinner party...Their corporate base was in New York City or Los Angeles and we were out of the power structure.  No matter how many records you sold, all their promotion went to the big pop acts signed to both coasts.  You had to fight and scratch for any attention at all from the record company.  Country music reacted to that by drawing the wagons, gettin' defensive, and building a wall around Nashville that kept country artists in rather than outsiders out...They wanted all of the country hit records to be cut in Nashville."

Singer of Sad Songs finds Jennings inching his way towards the full-blown revolt he would wage against RCA a few years later and features selections originating from untraditional country sources, such as the Rolling Stones song "Honky Tonk Woman" and Tim Hardin's folk song "If I Were a Carpenter."  The album has a guitar-laden sound and buoyancy that Jennings would continue to explore as he honed his sound on vinyl, with Thom Jurek of AllMusic observing:

"Up to three and four guitars play on each track, with Hazlewood stripping everything back while adding the layers of phase and reverb that would become signifiers of Jennings' trademark. The performances here are suave but not smooth, moving but far from melodramatic. In fact, they are archetypal - if not overly rowdy - readings of the renegade freedom songs that literally spawned the outlaw generation's reliance on anthems of alienated individuals at odds with everything and everyone, yet still seeking purpose and a way home from the edge of a drifting way of life."

Singer of Sad Songs gave Jennings his worst showing on the charts since 1967, peaking at #23 on the Billboard country albums chart, although this was primarily due to RCA's lack of support rather than the material.  Waylon's new wife Jessi Colter is featured on the album cover.

Track listing
"Singer of Sad Songs" (Alex Zanetis) – 2:58
"Sick and Tired" (Dave Bartholomew, Chris Kenner) – 1:55
"Time Between Bottles of Wine" (Jimmie Morris) – 2:18
"Must You Throw Dirt in My Face" (Bill Anderson) – 2:17
"No Regrets" (Tom Rush) – 3:11
"Ragged but Right" (George Jones) – 2:12
"Honky Tonk Woman" (Mick Jagger, Keith Richards) - 2:58
"She Comes Running" (Lee Hazlewood) – 2:11
"If I Were a Carpenter" (Tim Hardin) – 2:24
"Donna on My Mind" (Billy Barton) – 2:12
"Rock, Salt and Nails" (Utah Philips) – 2:08

1970 albums
albums produced by Lee Hazlewood
Waylon Jennings albums
RCA Records albums